Gog and Magog (Gōg ū-Māgōg) appear in the Bible and the Quran as individuals, tribes, or lands. In Ezekiel 38, Gog is an individual and Magog is his land; in Genesis 10, Magog is a man and eponymous ancestor of a nation, but no Gog is mentioned; by the time of  Jewish tradition had long since changed Ezekiel's "Gog from Magog" into "Gog and Magog".

The Gog prophecy is meant to be fulfilled at the approach of what is called the "end of days", but not necessarily the end of the world. Jewish eschatology viewed Gog and Magog as enemies to be defeated by the Messiah, which would usher in the age of the Messiah. One view within Christianity is more starkly apocalyptic, making Gog and Magog, here indicating nations rather than individuals, allies of Satan against God at the end of the millennium, as described in the Book of Revelation.

A legend was attached to Gog and Magog by the time of the Roman period, that the Gates of Alexander were erected by Alexander the Great to repel the tribe. Romanized Jewish historian Josephus knew them as the nation descended from Magog the Japhetite, as in Genesis, and explained them to be the Scythians. In the hands of Early Christian writers they became apocalyptic hordes. Throughout the Middle Ages, they were variously identified as the Vikings, Huns, Khazars, Mongols, Turanians or other nomads, or even the Ten Lost Tribes of Israel.

The legend of Gog and Magog and the gates were also interpolated into the Alexander Romances. According to one interpretation, "Goth and Magothy" are the kings of the Unclean Nations who Alexander drove through a mountain pass and prevented from crossing his new wall. Gog and Magog are said to engage in human cannibalism in the romances and derived literature. They have also been depicted on Medieval cosmological maps, or mappae mundi, sometimes alongside Alexander's wall.

The conflation of Gog and Magog with the legend of Alexander and the Iron Gates was disseminated throughout the Near East in the early centuries of the Christian and Islamic era. They appear in the Quran in chapter Al-Kahf as Yajuj and Majuj (Yaʾjūj wa-Maʾjūj), primitive and immoral tribes that were separated and barriered off by Dhu al-Qarnayn ("He of the Two Horns") who is mentioned in the Quran as a great righteous ruler and conqueror. Some contemporary Muslim historians and geographers regarded the Vikings as the emergence of Gog and Magog.

Names

The names are mentioned together in Ezekiel chapter 38, where Gog is an individual and Magog is his land. The meaning of the name Gog remains uncertain, and in any case, the author of the Ezekiel prophecy seems to attach no particular importance to it. Efforts have been made to identify him with various individuals, notably Gyges, a king of Lydia in the early 7th century BC, but many scholars do not believe he is related to any historical person.

In Genesis 10 Magog is described as a son of Japheth, grandson of Noah, although there is no mention there of a person named Gog. The name Magog itself is of obscure origin. It is often associated with Assyrian mat-Gugu, "Land of Gyges", i.e., Lydia. Alternatively, Gog may be derived from Magog rather than the other way around, and "Magog" may be code for Babylon.

The form "Gog and Magog" may have emerged as shorthand for "Gog and/of the land of Magog", based on their usage in the Septuagint, the Greek translation of the Hebrew Bible. An example of this combined form in Hebrew (Gog u-Magog) has been found, but its context is unclear, being preserved only in a fragment of the Dead Sea Scrolls. In Revelation, Gog and Magog together are the hostile nations of the world. Gog or Goug the Reubenite occurs in 1 Chronicles , but he appears to have no connection with the Gog of Ezekiel or Magog of Genesis.

The Biblical "Gog and Magog" possibly gave derivation of the name Gogmagog, a legendary British giant. A later corrupted folk rendition in print altered the tradition around Gogmagog and Corineus with two giants Gog and Magog, with whom the Guildhall statues came to be identified.

Jewish texts

Ezekiel

The Book of Ezekiel records a series of visions received by the prophet Ezekiel, a priest of Solomon's Temple, who was among the captives
during the Babylonian exile. The exile, he tells his fellow captives, is God's punishment on Israel for turning away, but God will restore his people to Jerusalem when they return to him. After this message of reassurance, chapters 38–39, the Gog oracle, tell how Gog of Magog and his hordes will threaten the restored Israel but will be destroyed, after which God will establish a new Temple and dwell with his people for a period of lasting peace (chapters 40–48).

"Son of man, direct your face against Gog, of the land of Magog, the prince, leader of Meshech and Tubal, and prophesy concerning him. Say: Thus said the Lord: Behold, I am against you, Gog, the prince, leader of Meshech and Tubal ... Persia, Cush and Put will be with you ... also Gomer with all its troops, and Beth Togarmah from the far north with all its troops—the many nations with you."

Internal evidence indicates that the Gog oracle was composed substantially later than the chapters around it. Of Gog's allies, Meshech and Tubal were 7th-century BC kingdoms in central Anatolia north of Israel, Persia towards the east, Cush (Ethiopia) and Put (Libya) to the south; Gomer is the Cimmerians, a nomadic people north of the Black Sea, and Beth Togarmah was on the border of Tubal. The confederation thus represents a multinational alliance surrounding Israel. "Why the prophet's gaze should have focused on these particular nations is unclear," comments Biblical scholar Daniel I. Block, but their remoteness and reputation for violence and mystery possibly "made Gog and his confederates perfect symbols of the archetypal enemy, rising against God and his people". One explanation is that the Gog alliance, a blend of the "Table of Nations" in Genesis 10 and Tyre's trading partners in Ezekiel 27, with Persia added, was cast in the role of end-time enemies of Israel by means of Isaiah 66:19, which is another text of eschatological foretelling.

Although the prophecy refers to Gog as an enemy in some future, it is not clear if the confrontation is meant to occur in a final "end of days" since the Hebrew term aḥarit ha-yamim may merely mean "latter days", and is open to interpretation. Twentieth-century scholars have used the term to denote the eschaton in a malleable sense, not necessarily meaning final days, or tied to the Apocalypse. Still, the Utopia of chapters 40–48 can be spoken of in the parlance of "true eschatological character, given that it is a product of "cosmic conflict" described in the immediately preceding Gog chapters.

The Septuagint reads "Gog" instead of "Agag" in Numbers 24:7.

Over the next few centuries Jewish tradition changed Ezekiel's Gog from Magog into Gog and Magog. The process, and the shifting geography of Gog and Magog, can be traced through the literature of the period. The 3rd book of the Sibylline Oracles, for example, which originated in Egyptian Judaism in the middle of the 2nd century BC, changes Ezekiel's "Gog from Magog" to "Gog and Magog", links their fate with up to eleven other nations, and places them "in the midst of Aethiopian rivers"; this seems a strange location, but ancient geography did sometimes place Ethiopia next to Persia or even India. The passage has a highly uncertain text, with manuscripts varying in their groupings of the letters of the Greek text into words, leading to different readings; one group of manuscripts ("group Y") links them with the "Marsians and Dacians", in eastern Europe, amongst others.

The Book of Jubilees, from about the same time, makes three references to either Gog or Magog: in the first, Magog is a descendant of Noah, as in Genesis 10; in the second, Gog is a region next to Japheth's borders; and in the third, a portion of Japheth's land is assigned to Magog. The 1st-century Liber Antiquitatum Biblicarum, which retells Biblical history from Adam to Saul, is notable for listing and naming seven of Magog's sons, and mentions his "thousands" of descendants. The Samaritan Torah and the Septuagint (a Greek translation of the Hebrew Bible made during the last few centuries of the pre-Christian era) occasionally introduce the name of Gog where the Hebrew original has something else, or use Magog where the Hebrew has Gog, indicating that the names were interchangeable.

Midrashic writings
The anti-Roman Bar Kokhba revolt in the 2nd century AD looked to a human leader as the promised messiah, but after its failure Jews began to conceive of the messianic age in supernatural terms: first would come a forerunner, the Messiah ben Joseph, who would defeat Israel's enemies, identified as Gog and Magog, to prepare the way for the Messiah ben David; then the dead would rise, divine judgement would be handed out, and the righteous would be rewarded.

The aggadah, homiletic and non-legalistic exegetical texts in the classical rabbinic literature of Judaism, treat Gog and Magog as two names for the same nation who will come against Israel in the final war. The rabbis associated no specific nation or territory with them beyond a location to the north of Israel, but the great Jewish scholar Rashi identified the Christians as their allies and said God would thwart their plan to kill all Israel.

Christian texts
Chapters 19:11–21:8 of the Book of Revelation, dating from the end of the 1st century AD, tells how Satan is to be imprisoned for a thousand years, and how, on his release, he will rally "the nations in the four corners of the Earth, Gog and Magog", to a final battle with Christ and his saints:

When the thousand years are over, Satan will be released from his prison and will go out to deceive the nations in the four corners of the Earth—Gog and Magog—and to gather them for battle. In number they are like the sand on the seashore.

Islamic texts

Two chapters of the Quran, Al Kahf and Al-Anbiya, discuss Gog and Magog. In the Quran Yajuj and Majuj (Gog and Magog) are suppressed by Dhu al-Qarnayn "The Two-Horned One". Dhul-Qarnayn, having journeyed to the ends of the world, meets "a people who scarcely understood a word" who seek his help in building a barrier that will separate them from the people of Yajuj and Majuj who "do great mischief on earth". He agrees to build it for them, but warns that when the time comes (Last Age), Allah will remove the barrier.

The early Muslim traditions were summarised by Zakariya al-Qazwini (d. 1283) in two popular works called the Cosmography and the Geography. Gog and Magog, he says, live near to the sea that encircles the Earth and can be counted only by God; this sea is claimed to be the Caspian sea, Black sea or the Sea of Azov. They are human, but only half the height of a normal man, with small eyes almost like the Mongols, with claws instead of nails, and a hairy tail and huge hairy ears which they use as mattress and cover for sleeping. They dig into their wall each day until they almost break through. They break for the night saying, "Tomorrow we will finish", but each night God restores it. Then one day, as they stop digging for the night, one will say, "Tomorrow we will finish, God Willing", and in the morning, it is not restored as with every night. When they do break through, they will be so numerous that, "Their vanguard is in Syria and their rear in Khorasan".

Various nations and peoples in history were identified as Ya'juj and Ma'juj. At one point, it was the Turks, who threatened Baghdad and northern Iran; later, when the Mongols destroyed Baghdad in 1258, it was they who were Gog and Magog. The wall dividing them from civilized peoples was normally placed towards today's Armenia and Azerbaijan, but in the year 842 the Caliph Al-Wathiq had a dream in which he saw that it had been breached, and sent an official named Sallam to investigate (this may be related to Ergenekon). Sallam returned a little over two years later and reported that he had seen the wall and also the tower where Dhul Qarnayn had left his building equipment, and all was still intact. It is not entirely clear what Sallam saw, but he may have reached Derbent in the Caucuses or the Jade Gate and the westernmost customs point on the border of China. Somewhat later the 14th-century traveller Ibn Battuta reported that the wall was sixty days' travel from the city of Zeitun, which is on the coast of China; the translator notes that Ibn Battuta has confused the Great Wall of China with that built by Dhul-Qarnayn.

According to Shia sources, Yajooj and Majooj are not from the Children of Adam (the human race). However, in other sources, they're described as small-eyed humans. Al-Kafi, one of their primary collections of ahadith, states that it has been narrated from Ibn Abbas that when he asked Ali about the "creatures", he responded by saying God has created "1,200 species on the land, 1,200 species in the sea, 70 species from the Children of Adam and the people are the Children of Adam except for the Yajooj and Majooj". 

This is in contradiction with many reports in Sunni sources, including those in Sahih Al-Bukhari and Sahih Muslim, which indicate they will indeed be from the Children of Adam, and this is the belief of the overwhelming majority of Islamic scholars.  The "Abbasid orthodoxy" believed the Ilkhanate Mongol invaders who laid siege to and then sacked Baghdad, were Gog and Magog.

Various modern scholars of history and geography regarded the Vikings and their descendants as Gog and Magog, since the unknown group from Scandinavia had made their sudden and considerable entry into the history of Europe. Viking travelers and colonists were seen at many points in history as violent raiders. Many historical documents suggest that their conquests of other territories was retaliation in response to the encroachment upon tribal lands by Christian missionaries, and perhaps by the Saxon Wars prosecuted by Charlemagne and his kin to the south. Researches of professors and philosophers such as Allama Muhammad Iqbal, Syeed Abul Ala Mawdudi, who played important roles in British and South Asian politics, and American academic Abu Ammaar Yasir Qadhi and Caribbean eschatologist Imran N. Hosein, compare the languages, behaviors and sexual activities of the tribes of Gog and Magog with those of Vikings.

According to Sahih Muslim, the Prophet said:
Then a people whom Allah had protected from him (dajjal) would come to Isa, son of Maryam, and he would wipe their faces and would inform them of their ranks in Paradise and it would be under such conditions that Allah would reveal to Isa (alaihis salam) these words: I have brought forth from amongst My servants such people against whom none would be able to fight; you take these people safely to Tur, and then Allah would send Gog and Magog and they would swarm down from every slope. The first of them would pass the lake of Tiberias and drink out of it. And when the last of them would pass, he would say: There was once water there.

Some scholars further attempt to relate the last portion of the interpretation of Yajuj and Majuj to the Lake of Tiberias, currently known as the Sea of Galilee, the Earth's lowest freshwater lake, and the Dead Sea.

Historian and exegete Ibn Kathir mentioned similar theories in his book Al-Bidaya wa'l-Nihaya and mentions “Gog and Magog are two groups of Turks, descended from Yafith (Japheth), the father of the Turks, one of the sons of Noah.

In Ahmadiyya 

Mirza Ghulam Ahmad (d.1908), the founder of the Ahmadiyya movement, identified Gog and Magog with the European powers that had emerged from the Slavic and Germanic peoples respectively, with particular reference to their political duplicity and shattering of world peace. Ahmadiyya exegeses draw upon the etymological connection of the Arabic cognate Yaʾjūj wa-Maʾjūj with the underlying themes of "blazing fire", "hastiness" and "boiling water" to what is viewed as the superlative industrial use of fire and steam by these peoples and to their restless political character. According to these teachings, the conflict between Russia and the United States as two superpowers, or the militant rivalry between the communist and capitalist systems and their impact over the nations of the world, is thus seen as having occurred in accordance with prophecies concerning Gog and Magog. These powers cannot be defeated through military force and are to be overcome through prayer and divine intervention. Islam is then seen as that which alone would succeed in bringing people of different nations together as per the Quran.

Alexander the Great

The 1st-century Jewish historian Josephus equated Magog with the Scythians in Antiquities of the Jews, but he never mentioned Gog. In another work, Josephus recounts that the Alans (whom he calls a Scythian tribe) were given passage by the Hyrcanian king, a warder of an iron gate built by Alexander. By the time of Josephus, Alexander was already a Jewish folk hero. However, the earliest fusion of Alexander's gate and the apocalyptic nations of Gog and Magog is a product of late antiquity, in what is known as the Syriac Legend of Alexander.

Precursor texts in Syriac

In the Syriac Alexander Legend dating to 629–630, Gog (gwg) and Magog (ܵ, mgwg) appear as kings of Hunnish nations. Written by a Christian based in Mesopotamia, the Legend is considered the first work to connect the Gates with the idea that Gog and Magog are destined to play a role in the apocalypse. The legend claims that Alexander carved prophecies on the face of the Gate, marking a date for when these Huns, consisting of 24 nations, will breach the Gate and subjugate the greater part of the world.

The Pseudo-Methodius, written originally in Syriac, is considered the source of the Gog and Magog tale incorporated into Western versions of the Alexander Romance. The earlier-dated Syriac Alexander Legend contains a somewhat different treatment of the Gog and Magog material, which passed into the lost Arabic version, or the Ethiopic and later Oriental versions of the Alexander romance.

The Pseudo-Methodius (7th century) is the first source in the Christian tradition for a new element: two mountains moving together to narrow the corridor, which was then sealed with a gate against Gog and Magog. This idea is also in the Quran  and found its way in the Western Alexander Romance.

Alexander Romances
This Gog and Magog legend is not found in earlier versions of the Alexander Romance of Pseudo-Callisthenes, whose oldest manuscript dates to the 3rd century, but an interpolation into recensions around the 8th century. In the latest and longest Greek version are described the Unclean Nations, which include the Goth and Magoth as their kings, and whose people engage in the habit of eating worms, dogs, human cadavers and fetuses. They were allied to Belsyrians (Bebrykes, of Bithynia in modern-day North Turkey), and sealed beyond the "Breasts of the North", a pair of mountains fifty days' march away towards the north.

Gog and Magog appear in somewhat later Old French versions of the romance. In the verse Roman d'Alexandre, Branch III, of Lambert le Tort (c. 1170), Gog and Magog ("Gos et Margos", "Got et Margot") were vassals to Porus, king of India, providing an auxiliary force of 400,000 men. Routed by Alexander, they escaped through a defile in the mountains of Tus (or Turs), and were sealed by the wall erected there, to last until the advent of the Antichrist. Branch IV of the poetic cycle tells that the task of guarding Gog and Magog, as well as the rule of Syria and Persia was assigned to Antigonus, one of Alexander's successors.

Gog and Magog also appear in Thomas de Kent's Roman de toute chevalerie (c. 1180), where they are portrayed as cave-dwellers who consume human flesh. A condensed account occurs in a derivative work, the Middle English King Alisaunder (vv. 5938–6287). In the 13th-century French Roman d'Alexandre en prose, Alexander has an encounter with cannibals who have taken over the role of Gog and Magog. This is a case of imperfect transmission, since the prose Alexander'''s source, the Latin work by Archpriest Leo of Naples known as Historia de Preliis, does mention "Gogh et Macgogh", at least in some manuscripts.

The Gog and Magog are not only human flesh-eaters, but illustrated as men "a notably beaked nose" in examples such as the "Sawley map", an important example of mappa mundi. Gog and Magog caricaturised as figures with hooked noses on a miniature depicting their attack of the Holy City, found in a manuscript of the Apocalypse in Anglo-Norman.

Identification with civilisations
Early Christian writers (e.g. Eusebius) frequently identified Gog and Magog with the Romans and their emperor. After the Empire became Christian, Ambrose (d. 397) identified Gog with the Goths, Jerome (d. 420) with the Scythians, and Jordanes (died c. 555) said that Goths, Scythians and Amazons were all the same; he also cited Alexander's gates in the Caucasus. The Byzantine writer Procopius said it was the Huns Alexander had locked out, and a Western monk named Fredegar seems to have Gog and Magog in mind in his description of savage hordes from beyond Alexander's gates who had assisted the Byzantine emperor Heraclius (610–641) against the Muslim Saracens.

Nomadic identification
As one nomadic people followed another on the Eurasian steppes, so the identification of Gog and Magog shifted. In the 9th and 10th centuries these kingdoms were identified by some with the lands of the Khazars, a Turkic people whose leaders had converted to Judaism and whose empire dominated Central Asia–the 9th-century monk Christian of Stavelot referred to Gazari, said of the Khazars that they were "living in the lands of Gog and Magog" and noted that they were "circumcised and observing all [the laws of] Judaism". Arab traveler ibn Fadlan also reported of this belief, writing around 921 he recorded that "Some hold the opinion that Gog and Magog are the Khazars".

After the Khazars came the Mongols, seen as a mysterious and invincible horde from the east who destroyed Muslim empires and kingdoms in the early 13th century; kings and popes took them for the legendary Prester John, marching to save Christians from the Muslim Saracens, but when they entered Poland and Hungary and annihilated Christian armies a terrified Europe concluded that they were "Magogoli", the offspring of Gog and Magog, released from the prison Alexander had constructed for them and heralding Armageddon.

Europeans in Medieval China reported findings from their travels to the Mongol Empire. Some accounts and maps began to place the "Caspian Mountains", and Gog and Magog, just outside the Great Wall of China. The Tartar Relation, an obscure account of Friar Carpini's 1240s journey to Mongolia, is unique in alleging that these Caspian Mountains in Mongolia, "where the Jews called Gog and Magog by their fellow countrymen are said to have been shut in by Alexander", were moreover purported by the Tartars to be magnetic, causing all iron equipment and weapons to fly off toward the mountains on approach. In 1251, the French friar André de Longjumeau informed his king that the Mongols originated from a desert further east, and an apocalyptic Gog and Magog ("Got and Margoth") people dwelled further beyond, confined by the mountains. In the map of Sharif Idrisi, the land of Gog and Magog is drawn in the northeast corner (beyond Northeast Asia) and enclosed. Some medieval European world maps also show the location of the lands of Gog and Magog in the far northeast of Asia (and the northeast corner of the world).

In fact, Gog and Magog were held by the Mongol to be their ancestors, at least by some segment of the population. As traveler and Friar Riccoldo da Monte di Croce put it in c. 1291, "They say themselves that they are descended from Gog and Magog: and on this account they are called Mogoli, as if from a corruption of Magogoli". Marco Polo, traveling when the initial terror had subsided, places Gog and Magog among the Tartars in Tenduc, but then claims that the names Gog and Magog are translations of the place-names Ung and Mungul, inhabited by the Ung and Mongols respectively.

An explanation offered by Orientalist Henry Yule was that Marco Polo was only referring to the "Rampart of Gog and Magog", a name for the Great Wall of China. Friar André's placement of Gog and Magog far east of Mongolia has been similarly explained.

The confined Jews

Some time around the 12th century, the Ten Lost Tribes of Israel came to be identified with Gog and Magog; possibly the first to do so was Petrus Comestor in Historica Scholastica (c. 1169–1173), and he was indeed a far greater influence than others before him, although the idea had been anticipated by the aforementioned Christian of Stavelot, who noted that the Khazhars, to be identified with Gog and Magog, was one of seven tribes of the Hungarians and had converted to Judaism.

While the confounding Gog and Magog as confined Jews was becoming commonplace, some, like Riccoldo or Vincent de Beauvais remained skeptics, and distinguished the Lost Tribes from Gog and Magog. As noted, Riccoldo had reported a Mongol folk-tradition that they were descended from Gog and Magog. He also addressed many minds (Westerners or otherwise) being credulous of the notion that Mongols might be Captive Jews, but after weighing the pros and cons, he concluded this was an open question.

The Flemish Franciscan friar William of Rubruck, who was first-hand witness to Alexander's supposed wall in Derbent on the shores of the Caspian Sea in 1254, identified the people the walls were meant to fend off only vaguely as "wild tribes" or "desert nomads", but one researcher made the inference Rubruck must have meant Jews, and that he was speaking in the context of "Gog and Magog". Confined Jews were later to be referred to as "Red Jews" (die roten Juden) in German-speaking areas; a term first used in a Holy Grail epic dating to the 1270s, in which Gog and Magog were two mountains enclosing these people.

The author of the Travels of Sir John Mandeville, a 14th-century best-seller, said he had found these Jews in Central Asia where as Gog and Magog they had been imprisoned by Alexander, plotting to escape and join with the Jews of Europe to destroy Christians.

In the Borgia map, a copper-engraved world map probably produced in Southern Germany , the most eastern part contains two fortified regions depicting Gog and Magog, with the following Latin inscriptions:

The province of Gog, in which the Jews were confined during the time of Artaxerxes, king of the Persians.

Magog – in these two are large people and giants who are full of all kinds of bad behaviors. These Jews were collected by Artaxerxes from all parts of Persia.

The Persian king Artaxerxes (either Artaxerxes I or Artaxerxes II, appearing in the Book of Ezra 7) was commonly confused in Medieval Europe with the Neo-Assyrian ruler Shalmaneser V, who according to 2 Kings 17 drove the Ten Lost Tribes of Israel into exile.

Modern apocalypticism
In the early 19th century, some Hasidic rabbis identified the French invasion of Russia under Napoleon as "The War of Gog and Magog". But as the century progressed, apocalyptic expectations receded as the populace in Europe began to adopt an increasingly secular worldview. This has not been the case in the United States, where a 2002 poll indicated that 59% of Americans believed the events predicted in the Book of Revelation would come to pass. During the Cold War the idea that Soviet Russia had the role of Gog gained popularity, since Ezekiel's words describing him as "prince of Meshek" – rosh meshek'' in Hebrew – sounded suspiciously like Russia and Moscow. Even some Russians took up the idea, apparently unconcerned by the implications ("Ancestors were found in the Bible, and that was enough"), as did Ronald Reagan.

Some post-Cold War millenarians still identify Gog with Russia, but they now tend to stress its allies among Islamic nations, especially Iran. For the most fervent, the countdown to Armageddon began with the return of the Jews to Israel, followed quickly by further signs pointing to the nearness of the final battle – nuclear weapons, European integration, Israel's reunification of Jerusalem in the Six Day War in 1967, and America's wars in Afghanistan and the Persian Gulf. 

In the Islamic apocalyptic tradition, the end of the world would be preceded by the release of Gog and Magog, whose destruction by God in a single night would usher in the Day of Resurrection. Reinterpretation did not generally continue after Classical times, but the needs of the modern world have produced a new body of apocalyptic literature in which Gog and Magog are identified as Communist Russia and China. One problem these writers have had to confront is the barrier holding Gog and Magog back, which is not to be found in the modern world: the answer varies, some writers saying that Gog and Magog were the Mongols and that the wall is now gone, others that both the wall and Gog and Magog are invisible.

See also

 Gog (film)
 Alexander the Great in the Quran
 Cyrus the Great in the Quran
 Eschatology
 Magog
 Sasanian defense lines
 Bunkers in Albania

Explanatory notes

References

Citations

Bibliography 

Monographs
 
 
 
 
 
 
 

Encyclopedias
 
 
 

Biblical studies
 
 

Literary
 
 
 
 
 

Geography and ethnography
 
 
 
 
 


Modern apocalyptic thought
 
 
 
 

 
Articles about multiple people in the Quran
Biblical phrases
Book of Revelation
Mythological duos
Islamic mythology
Japheth
Jewish eschatology
Jewish messianism
Kabbalistic words and phrases
Monarchs of the Hebrew Bible
Book of Jubilees